Halmay is a surname. Notable people with the surname include:

Gyula Halmay (1910–death unknown), Hungarian rower
József Halmay, Hungarian sprint canoeist
Tibor Halmay (1894–1944), Hungarian stage and film actor
Zoltán Halmay (1881–1956), Hungarian Olympic swimmer

See also
Halme